Vader may refer to:


Arts and entertainment
Darth Vader, a fictional character in the Star Wars series
Chad Vader, the title character of the American comedy fan web series Chad Vader: Day Shift Manager 
a title character of Vader & Zoon, a Dutch newspaper comic strip by Peter van Straaten
Vader (band), a Polish death metal band

Places
Vader (crater), a crater on Pluto's moon Charon named after Darth Vader
Vader, Washington, United States, a city

People
Artur Vader (1920–1978), Estonian Soviet politician
Els Vader (1959–2021), Dutch sprinter
 Milan Vader (born 1996), Dutch cyclist 
Travis Vader, convicted killer
Vader or Big Van Vader, a ring name of American professional wrestler Leon Allen White (1955-2018)

See also
 Vater (disambiguation)